This is a list of diplomatic missions of Myanmar. Myanmar (also known as Burma) has a relatively light diplomatic presence in the world, reflecting decades of self-imposed isolation.

Diplomatic missions

Gallery

See also
Foreign relations of Myanmar
List of diplomatic missions in Myanmar
Visa policy of Myanmar

External links and references

 Ministry of Foreign Affairs of Myanmar

 
Myanmar
Diplomatic missions